Sex, Love and Rock 'n' Roll is the sixth album by American punk rock band Social Distortion. It is their first studio album in eight years, since the release of White Light, White Heat, White Trash in 1996. The album was originally scheduled to be released in the fall of 2000, but was not yet completed, and it was officially released on September 28, 2004. This album is Social Distortion's first to feature guitarist Jonny Wickersham, following the death of original guitarist Dennis Danell in February 2000. The album's opening track, "Reach for the Sky", was released in late 2004 and became one of Social Distortion's biggest hits.

Social Distortion could not release a follow-up to White Light, White Heat, White Trash partly because of their various other activities, most obviously those of frontman Mike Ness. He released two solo albums in 1999, one with original material (Cheating at Solitaire) and one with song covers (Under the Influences). Touring behind these projects, and matters pertaining to Danell's death, set Sex, Love and Rock 'n' Roll aside for a number of years before finally being completed in 2004.

Sex, Love and Rock 'n' Roll was the first time since Social Distortion's 1990 self-titled album that Ness had collaborated with another songwriter. It was also the band's first album not to include a cover song since their 1983 debut album Mommy's Little Monster.

History
Sex, Love and Rock 'n' Roll traces its beginnings to the White Light, White Heat, White Trash tour in 1997, where Ness began writing new material for the sixth Social Distortion album. One of the new songs, "I Won't Run No More", was first performed at a concert in Germany that year. In 1998, with Social Distortion not working, Ness launched a solo career and decided to record some of the songs for his first album, Cheating at Solitaire.

In November 1999, Ness added more details to the possibility of a follow-up to White Light, White Heat, White Trash and mentioned he would "like to get one out" in fall 2000. In May 2001, a questioner asked Ness how the album was coming along. He replied, "Slow." His wife elaborated that he was in "home mode", working on restoring a house in Santa Ana, CA. The band was rumored to resume recording in June or July.

In July 2001, five songs that were going to appear on the album were announced. The songs were "Road Zombie", "Winners and Losers", "I Wasn't Born to Follow", "Don't Take Me for Granted" and "Footprints on My Ceiling". "Don't Take Me for Granted" was the only known unreleased song that the band played at the When the Angels Sing benefit concert in 2000. In July 2001, in a Los Angeles Times article, Ness discussed the possibility of releasing the album in spring 2002 and mentioned an invitation from Johnny Cash to record together.

In January 2002, an inside source reported that Social Distortion was planning to begin recording the album in March and began recording demos for the album in October, with an intended release date of spring 2003. In October 2003, the band announced on their official website that they were planning to enter a studio in Los Angeles, California, in November to finish work on the album. During a January 11, 2004, concert in Orlando, Florida, Ness revealed that the album was "three-quarters of the way completed" and mixing began in June.

A January 2003 issue of a German magazine Visions conducted an interview with Ness. About the album, he says: "Definitely more glam and seventies influences and less country since I'm able to realize this part of me better by the Mike Ness Band. And certainly more hope and light than on White Light, White Heat, White Trash. You can't forever tell yourself and others that life's all bad. Apart from other things, punk rock also is about fun and loud guitars. Before doing the last album I went through a really hard time, and even if not all is great in my life, I'm much better now than at that time."

On August 5, 2004, Social Distortion announced on their official website that the album would be called Sex, Love and Rock 'n' Roll and would officially be released on September 28. On the same day, it was announced that bass guitarist John Maurer, who recorded the album, had left the band to "in order to stay home and devote time to his wife and two children". On tour, Rancid's Matt Freeman joined as his replacement, then was himself replaced a few months later by Ness' touring bass guitarist for his solo project, Brent Harding.

Reception

Critical reviews of Sex, Love and Rock 'n' Roll were mostly positive. AllMusic's Mark Deming gave the album a rating of four stars out of five and states: "Sex, Love and Rock 'n' Roll shows that Social Distortion have held onto what made them great while growing and changing in the best ways, and the result is one of the best albums this band has made to date." In 2005, the album was ranked number 456 in Rock Hard magazine's book The 500 Greatest Rock & Metal Albums of All Time.

Track listing
All songs written by Mike Ness unless otherwise noted.
 "Reach for the Sky" – 3:31
 "Highway 101" – 3:44
 "Don't Take Me for Granted" – 3:47
 "Footprints on My Ceiling" – 5:08
 "Nickels and Dimes" (J. Wickersham/Ness) – 3:05
 "I Wasn't Born to Follow" – 2:55
 "Winners and Losers" – 4:45
 "Faithless" (Wickersham/Ness) – 3:02
 "Live Before You Die" – 2:47
 "Angel's Wings" (Wickersham/Ness) – 4:59
 "Mommy's little monster" (only in the European edition, from Live in Orange County DVD)

Personnel
 Mike Ness – lead vocals, lead guitar
 Jonny Wickersham – rhythm guitar
 John Maurer – bass guitar, backing vocals
 Charlie Quintana – drums

Additional Musicians
 Dan McGough - B3 organ

Charts

Album

Singles

References

Social Distortion albums
2004 albums